The Schneehorn is a mountain of the Bernese Alps, located on the border in Canton of Bern. It lies nord of the Jungfrau. There is an other mountain with the same name near the Wildstrubel (VS/BE).

References

External links
 Schneehorn on Hikr

Mountains of the Alps
Alpine three-thousanders
Mountains of Switzerland
Mountains of Valais
Mountains of the canton of Bern
Bern–Valais border